Gigi D'Agostino is the first studio album by Italian DJ Gigi D'Agostino. The album was released in 1996.

Track listing
"Gigi D'Agostino"
"Emotions"
"Before"
"Angel's Symphony"
"Sweetly"
"Love & Melody"
"My Dream"
"Strange"
"Purezza"
"Fly"
"Elektro Message"
"Singin"
"Free"
"Gigi's Violin"
"Another Theme"
"Special Track"
"Melody Voyager"
"Harmonic"
"Song for My Future"

Chart performance
The single "Sweetly" was released in February 1996 and was listed in the Dutch Singles Chart for six weeks, peaking at position 19.

References

1996 debut albums
Gigi D'Agostino albums